Ram-dao, or ramdao, is a traditional sacrificial sword used in the Hindu ritual sacrifice of animals. The large, curved blade is designed to decapitate a sacrificial animal in a single stroke. Ram-daos are used in a hacking swing, with the added weight on the curved end being intended for decapitations. The swords hilt and blade were often adorned with precious stones and metals.

Ram-daos are often depicted in Hindu religious imagery, often being wielded by the goddesses Durga and Kali. The sword was also embellished with religious imagery, symbols, and texts. This type of ritual sword was used widely by cultures in multiple regions including: Assam, Bengal, East India, Nepal, and North India. 

Despite the similar sounding names, this weapon is distinct from both the Chinese dao and the Naga dao swords which were traditionally used as slashing weapons.

References

External links 

Blade weapons
Cultural history of Nepal
Indian swords
Swords